Douglas O'Neal Middleton Jr. (born September 25, 1993) is an American football safety who is a free agent. He played college football at Appalachian State, and signed with the New York Jets as an undrafted free agent in 2016.

Early years and college career
Middleton attended Parkland High School in Winston-Salem, North Carolina, and Appalachian State University, where he played college football for the Appalachian State Mountaineers. As a junior in 2014, Middleton was named First-team All-Sun Belt Conference.

Professional career

New York Jets
Middleton signed with the New York Jets as an undrafted free agent on May 5, 2016. He was waived on September 3, 2016 and was signed to the practice squad the next day. He was promoted to the active roster on December 8, 2016. He scored his first career NFL touchdown in Week 17 against the Buffalo Bills, recovering a kickoff in the endzone.

On August 16, 2017, Middleton was waived/injured by the Jets after suffering a torn pectoral and placed on injured reserve.

Middleton entered the 2018 season slated as the backup free safety to Marcus Maye. He played in seven games with four starts in place of the injured Maye, before suffering another torn pectoral in Week 7. He was placed on injured reserve on October 23, 2018.

On September 1, 2019, Middleton was released by the Jets.

Miami Dolphins
On September 18, 2019, Middleton was signed by the Miami Dolphins. He was released on October 12, and re-signed to the practice squad on October 31. He was released on November 12.

Jacksonville Jaguars
On November 26, 2019, Middleton was signed to the Jacksonville Jaguars practice squad. He was promoted to the active roster on December 18, 2019.

On August 8, 2020, Middleton was released by the Jaguars.

Tennessee Titans
Middleton had a tryout with the Indianapolis Colts on August 18, 2020, and with the Tennessee Titans on August 23, 2020. He signed with the Titans on September 2, 2020, but was released three days later.

Jacksonville Jaguars (second stint)
On September 18, 2020, Middleton was signed to the Jacksonville Jaguars practice squad. He was promoted to the active roster on October 3, 2020. He was released on October 5 and re-signed to the practice squad the next day. He was placed on the practice squad/COVID-19 list by the team on October 17, 2020, and was activated back to the practice squad on October 22. He was promoted to the active roster on November 7. He was waived on November 9, and re-signed to the practice squad two days later. He was promoted to the active roster again on November 14. He was waived again on November 21, and re-signed to the practice squad again three days later. He was promoted to the active roster again on November 25. He was released after the season on May 4, 2021.

Carolina Panthers
On August 4, 2021, Middleton was signed by the Carolina Panthers. He was waived on August 28, 2021. He was re-signed to the practice squad on October 13, but released the next day.

San Francisco 49ers
On December 1, 2021, Middleton was signed to the San Francisco 49ers practice squad. He was released on January 26, 2022.

References

1993 births
Living people
American football safeties
Appalachian State Mountaineers football players
Carolina Panthers players
Jacksonville Jaguars players
Miami Dolphins players
New York Jets players
San Francisco 49ers players
Tennessee Titans players
Players of American football from Winston-Salem, North Carolina